The 2021–22 season was the 128th season in the existence of AC Sparta Prague and the club's 29th consecutive season in the top flight of Czech football. In addition to the domestic league, Sparta Prague participated in this season's editions of the Czech Cup, the UEFA Champions League, and the UEFA Europa League.

Players

First-team squad

Out on loan

Transfers

Pre-season and friendlies

Competitions

Overall record

Czech First League

Regular season

Results summary

Results by round

Matches

Championship group

Czech Cup

UEFA Champions League

Second qualifying round 
The draw for the second qualifying round was held on 16 June 2021.

Third qualifying round 
The draw for the third qualifying round was held on 19 July 2021.

UEFA Europa League

Group stage

Group A

Matches

UEFA Conference League

Knockout round play-offs

References 

AC Sparta Prague seasons
Sparta Prague
Slavia Prague